The following is a list of episodes of the CBS television series Rescue 911.  Unless indicated, segment titles are as they appeared in 1990s TV listings (e.g., as compiled by Fancast) when the show aired in syndication.  Titles denoted with an asterisk (*) were obtained from other sources and may be incorrect. Production numbers are according to the United States Copyright Office.

Series overview

Episodes

Specials (1989)

Special #1 (April 18, 1989)
Pilot Episode
The segments may not have been presented in the order listed

Special #2 (May 9, 1989)
Second Pilot Episode

Season 1 (1989–90)
Season 1 consists of 30 episodes (29 original episodes and 1 compilation episode), also Episodes #107-#108, #107 "Flooded Cave" and #108 "Miami cops Docu" has deleted scenes shown only in the intro and not in the actual segment/s.

Episode 1.1 (September 5, 1989)

Episode 1.2 (September 12, 1989)

Episode 1.3 (September 19, 1989)

Episode 1.4 (September 26, 1989)

Episode 1.5 (October 3, 1989)

Episode 1.6 (October 10, 1989)

Episode 1.7 (October 17, 1989)
Portions of this episode were preempted for CBS News coverage of the Loma Prieta Earthquake. It first aired in full on December 5, 1989.

Episode 1.8 (October 24, 1989)

Episode 1.9 (October 31, 1989)

Episode 1.10 (November 7, 1989)

Episode 1.11 (November 14, 1989)

Episode 1.12 (November 28, 1989)

Episode 1.13 (December 12, 1989)

Episode 1.14 (December 19, 1989)

Episode 1.15 (January 2, 1990)
[30-Minute Episode]

Episode 1.16 (January 9, 1990)

Episode 1.17 (January 23, 1990)

Episode 1.18 (January 30, 1990)

Episode 1.19 (February 13, 1990)

Episode 1.20 (February 27, 1990)

Episode 1.21 (February 28, 1990)

Episode 1.22 (March 13, 1990)

Episode 1.23 (March 20, 1990)
[30-Minute Episode]

Episode 1.24 (March 27, 1990)

Episode 1.25 (April 3, 1990)

Episode 1.26 (April 10, 1990)

Episode 1.27 (April 25, 1990)

Episode 1.28 (May 1, 1990)

Episode 1.29 (May 8, 1990)
This was a compilation episode that revisited highlights from the first season

Episode 1.30 (May 15, 1990)

Season 2 (1990–91)
 Season 2 consists of 29 original episodes.

Episode 2.1 (September 11, 1990)
30-Minute Episode

Episode 2.2 (September 18, 1990)

Episode 2.3 (September 25, 1990)

Episode 2.4 (October 2, 1990)

Episode 2.5 (October 23, 1990)

Episode 2.6 (October 30, 1990)

Episode 2.7 (November 6, 1990)

Episode 2.8 (November 13, 1990)
TV Listings indicate that the original airing of this episode included a segment about a Portland, Oregon man who broke through two windows to save his infant son from a house fire. However, all repeats of this episode exclude that segment and show "Smoke-Filled House" from Episode 1.8 in its place.

Episode 2.9 (November 20, 1990)

Episode 2.10 (November 27, 1990)

Episode 2.11 (December 4, 1990)

Episode 2.12 (December 18, 1990)

Episode 2.13 (January 1, 1991)

Episode 2.14 (January 8, 1991)

Episode 2.15 (January 22, 1991)

Episode 2.16 (January 29, 1991)

Episode 2.17 (February 5, 1991)

Episode 2.18 (February 12, 1991)

Episode 2.19 (February 19, 1991)

Episode 2.20 (February 26, 1991)

Episode 2.21 (March 5, 1991)

Episode 2.22 (March 19, 1991)
50-minute episode
Family Channel repeats of this episode included a repeat of the fire segment from Episode 1.9 as a filler segment to fill up the full hour time slot.

Episode 2.23 (March 26, 1991)
90-minute episode

Episode 2.24 (April 2, 1991)

Episode 2.25 (April 10, 1991)

Episode 2.26 (April 26, 1991)

Episode 2.27 (April 30, 1991)

Episode 2.28 (May 7, 1991)

Episode 2.29 (May 14, 1991)

Season 3 (1991–92)
Season 3 consists of 27 episodes (26 original episodes and 1 episode containing a mix of new and repeat segments).
This was Richard Stone's final season as music composer.

Episode 3.1 (September 17, 1991)
Production Number: 301H
30-minute episode

Episode 3.2 (September 24, 1991)
Production Number: 302

Episode 3.3 (October 1, 1991)
Production Number: 303

Episode 3.4 (October 8, 1991)
Production Number: 306H
30-minute episode

Episode 3.5 (October 15, 1991)
Production Number: 305

Episode 3.6 (October 29, 1991)
Production Number: 307

Episode 3.7 (November 5, 1991)
Production Number: 308

Episode 3.8 (November 12, 1991)
Production Number: 309
The original broadcast of this episode was 45 minutes long and did not include the segment "911 Armed Robbery Recovery".
"911 Armed Robbery Recovery" was first shown on an hour-long repeat of this episode (Production Number: 309R) that aired on June 23, 1992.

Episode 3.9 (November 19, 1991)
Production Number: 310

Episode 3.10 (November 26, 1991)
Production Number: 311

Episode 3.11 (December 10, 1991)
Production Number: 312

Episode 3.12 (December 17, 1991)
Production Number: 313

Episode 3.13 (January 7, 1992)
Production Number: 314

Episode 3.14 (January 14, 1992)
Production Number: 315

Episode 3.15 (January 24, 1992)
Production Number: 316

Episode 3.16 (January 28, 1992)
Production Number: 317

Episode 3.17 (February 4, 1992)
Production Number: 318

Episode 3.18 (February 7, 1992)
Production Number: 954
The two new segments from this episode ("EMT Husband Save" and "Freon Freak") were originally scheduled to air on October 15, 1991, as a 30-minute episode to accommodate Game 6 of the 1991 American League Championship Series. However, Game 6 was not needed, so CBS reverted to its regularly scheduled programming that night and aired Episode 3.5 (a full hour episode) instead.

Episode 3.19 (March 3, 1992)
Production Number: 319

Episode 3.20 (March 17, 1992)
Production Number: 320

Episode 3.21 (March 24, 1992)
Production Number: 321

Episode 3.22 (April 7, 1992)
Production Number: 322

Episode 3.23 (April 28, 1992)
Production Number: 323

Episode 3.24 (April 29, 1992)
Production Number: 324Q
15-minute episode

Episode 3.25 (May 5, 1992)
Production Number: 304H
30-minute episode

Episode 3.26 (May 12, 1992)
International Edition
Production Number: 325

Episode 3.27 (May 19, 1992)
Production Number: 326

Season 4 (1992–93)
Season 4 consists of 28 original episodes (one of which was postponed from Season 3).
Stu Goldberg became one of the show's music composers, and continued in that role until the show ended in 1996.

Episode 4.1 (September 15, 1992)
"100 Lives Saved"
Production Number: 401

Episode 4.2 (September 22, 1992)
Production Number: 402

Episode 4.3 (September 29, 1992)
Production Number: 403

Episode 4.4 (October 27, 1992)
Production Number: 406

Episode 4.5 (November 10, 1992)
Production Number: 407

Episode 4.6 (November 17, 1992)
Women Heroes Edition
Production Number: 408

Episode 4.7 (November 24, 1992) 
Production Number: 405H
30-minute episode

Episode 4.8 (November 25, 1992)
Production Number: 327
This episode was postponed from the third season. It was originally scheduled to air May 1, 1992.

Episode 4.9 (December 8, 1992)
Production Number: 409

Episode 4.10 (December 15, 1992)
Production Number: 411

Episode 4.11 (December 22, 1992)
Production Number: 404H
30-minute episode

Episode 4.12 (January 5, 1993)
Production Number: 412

Episode 4.13 (January 12, 1993)
Production Number: 410

Episode 4.14 (January 19, 1993)
Production Number: 413

Episode 4.15 (January 26, 1993)
Production Number:  414

Episode 4.16 (February 2, 1993)
Production Number: 416

Episode 4.17 (February 9, 1993)
100th Episode
Production Number: 415

Episode 4.18 (February 16, 1993)
Production Number: 417

Episode 4.19 (February 23, 1993)
International Edition
Production Number: 418

Episode 4.20 (March 2, 1993)
Production Number: 419H
30-minute episode

Episode 4.21 (March 9, 1993)
Production Number: 420

Episode 4.22 (March 23, 1993)
Production Number: 421

Episode 4.23 (March 30, 1993)
Production Number: 422

Episode 4.24 (April 13, 1993)
Production Number: 423

Episode 4.25 (May 4, 1993)
Production Number: 424

Episode 4.26 (May 11, 1993)
Production Number: 425

Episode 4.27 (May 18, 1993)
Production Number: 426

Episode 4.28 (May 25, 1993)
Child Safety Edition
Production Number: 427

Season 5 (1993–94)
Season 5 consisted of 28 episodes (26 original episodes and 2 compilation episodes).

Episode 5.1 (September 14, 1993)
Production Number: 501

Episode 5.2 (September 21, 1993)
Production Number: 502

Episode 5.3 (September 28, 1993)
Production Number: 503

Episode 5.4 (October 22, 1993)
Production Number: 508

Episode 5.5 (October 26, 1993)
Production Number: 505

Episode 5.6 (November 2, 1993)
Production Number: 506

Episode 5.7 (November 9, 1993)
Production Number: 509H
30 minute episode

Episode 5.8 (November 16, 1993)
Production Number: 510

Episode 5.9 (November 23, 1993)
"200 Lives Saved"
Production Number: 507

Episode 5.10 (November 30, 1993)
Production Number: 511

Episode 5.11 (December 14, 1993)
Production Number: 504

Episode 5.12 (December 21, 1993)
Production Number: 512

Episode 5.13 (January 4, 1994)
Production Number: 513

Episode 5.14 (January 11, 1994)
Production Number: 514

Episode 5.15 (January 18, 1994)
Production Number: 515

Episode 5.16 (January 25, 1994)
Kid Heroes
This compilation episode replayed some of the show's stories about kid heroes from past seasons.

Episode 5.17 (February 1, 1994)
Production Number: 516

Episode 5.18 (February 8, 1994)
Production Number: 517

Episode 5.19 (March 8, 1994)
Production Number: 518
 This episode was the normal 60 minutes, unlike other episodes with two segments. The second segment took up the last 45 minutes of the episode, with two commercial breaks.

Episode 5.20 (March 10, 1994)
Humorous Rescues
This compilation episode replayed some of the show's humorous rescue stories from past seasons. The segments may not have been presented in the order listed.

Episode 5.21 (March 15, 1994)
Production Number: 519

Episode 5.22 (March 22, 1994)
Production Number: 520

Episode 5.23 (March 29, 1994)
Animal Rescues Edition
Production Number: 521

Episode 5.24 (April 5, 1994)
Production Number: 522
The segment title "ATV Flip" was obtained from Pluto TV's on-demand watchlist for Rescue 911 and may be incomplete, as Pluto TV truncated many of the titles in its listings.

Episode 5.25 (May 3, 1994)
Production Number: 523

Episode 5.26 (May 10, 1994)
Child Safety Edition
Production Number: 524

Episode 5.27 (May 17, 1994)
Production Number: 525

Episode 5.28 (May 24, 1994)
Production Number: 526

Season 6 (1994–95)
Season 6 consists of 29 episodes (25 original episodes including a Christmas themed episode, 3 episodes containing a mix of new and repeat segments, and 1 episode containing all repeat segments).

Episode 6.1 (September 13, 1994)
Production Number: 955

Episode 6.2 (September 20, 1994)
Production Number: 601

Episode 6.3 (September 27, 1994)
Production Number: 602

Episode 6.4 (October 4, 1994)
Production Number: 603

Episode 6.5 (October 11, 1994)
Production Number: 604

Episode 6.6 (October 18, 1994)
Production Number: 605

Episode 6.7 (October 25, 1994)
Production Number: 606

Episode 6.8 (November 1, 1994)
Production Number: 607

Episode 6.9 (November 8, 1994)
Production Number: 608

Episode 6.10 (November 15, 1994)
Women Heroes Edition
Production Number: 609

Episode 6.11 (November 22, 1994)
Production Number: 610

Episode 6.12 (December 13, 1994)
Production Number: 611

Episode 6.13 (December 20, 1994)
Christmas Edition
Production Number: 612

Episode 6.14 (January 3, 1995)
Production Number: 613

Episode 6.15 (January 10, 1995)
Production Number: 614

Episode 6.16 (January 17, 1995)
Production Number: 615

Episode 6.17 (January 24, 1995)
Production Number: 956

Episode 6.18 (January 31, 1995)
Production Number: 616

Episode 6.19 (February 7, 1995)
Children Heroes Edition
Production Number: 617

Episode 6.20 (February 14, 1995)
Production Number: 618

Episode 6.21 (February 21, 1995)
Production Number: 619

Episode 6.22 (February 22, 1995)
Production Number: 957H
30-minute episode

Episode 6.23 (February 28, 1995)
Production Number: 620

Episode 6.24 (March 21, 1995)
Production Number: 621

Episode 6.25 (May 2, 1995)
Miracle Rescues Edition
Production Number: 622

Episode 6.26 (May 9, 1995)
Child Safety Edition
Production Number: 623

Episode 6.27 (May 16, 1995)
Production Number: 624

Episode 6.28 (May 17, 1995)
Production Number: 958H
30-minute episode

Episode 6.29 (May 23, 1995)
Production Number: 625

Season 7 (1995–96)
This season consisted of 15 episodes (14 original episodes and 1 episode containing a mix of new and repeat segments).

Episode 7.1 (September 12, 1995)
Production Number: 701
Note: The Writers Guild of America lists the production number as 631

Episode 7.2 (February 1, 1996)
Production Number: 628

Episode 7.3 (February 8, 1996)
Production Number: 629

Episode 7.4 (February 15, 1996)
Production Number: 707

Episode 7.5 (February 22, 1996)
Production Number: 709

Episode 7.6 (February 29, 1996)
Production Number: 708

Episode 7.7 (March 7, 1996)
Production Number: 630

Episode 7.8 (March 28, 1996)
Production Number: 626

Episode 7.9 (April 4, 1996)
Production Number: 712

Episode 7.10 (April 11, 1996)
Production Number: 710

Episode 7.11 (April 23, 1996)
Production Number: 913H
30-minute episode

Episode 7.12 (May 2, 1996)
Production Number: 627

Episode 7.13 (August 6, 1996)
Production Number: 711

Episode 7.14 (August 20, 1996)
Production Number: 713

Episode 7.15 (August 27, 1996)
Production Number: 714

Syndicated Episodes 
In 1993, a re-formatted version of Rescue 911 began airing in syndication. In this format, each episode ran 30 minutes and contained two stories (or sometimes one long-running story) taken from episodes that originally aired in the hour format on CBS.
 
The syndicated version of the series consisted of three "seasons" (hereafter referred to as "sets") of 100 episodes that initially aired in first-run syndication from 1993 to 1996. The syndicated version subsequently aired on several national networks including The Hallmark Channel (formerly Odyssey), Discovery Health Channel, Justice Network, and GetTV. 
 
The syndicated episodes are generally shown in production order when the series airs on national networks. When the show aired in first-run syndication, local affiliates across the U.S. aired the same block of five episodes within a given week, typically showing one episode per day Monday through Friday; the original air dates listed follow this convention. However, some stations deviated from this schedule (e.g., WCCB in Charlotte, NC aired two episodes Monday, two episodes Tuesday, and one episode Saturday for most of the first set). Although episodes aired somewhat out of production order in first-run syndication, especially in Set 1, blocks of five episodes aired in production order within a given week. The Justice Network air dates are included to establish the production order, as Justice has aired the most syndicated episodes to date (285 out of 300) of any U.S. network since the show aired in first-run syndication.

Set 1 
The first set of syndicated episodes originally aired from 1993 to 1994 and consisted of segments from Seasons 1–3 (including Episode 4.8, which was postponed from Season 3). The television listings did not provide episode descriptions for the weeks of August 23, August 30, and November 1, 1993, so the original air dates for 15 of the episodes in Set 1 may be earlier than the date given.

Set 2 
The second set of syndicated episodes originally aired from 1994 to 1995 and consisted of segments from Seasons 1–4, and the first four episodes (in production order) of Season 5. The Justice Network showed all 100 episodes from Set 2, making it the only set to be shown in its entirety since airing in first-run syndication.

Set 3 
The third set of syndicated episodes originally aired from 1995 to 1996 and consisted mainly of segments from Seasons 5 and 6, but a few segments from Seasons 1–4 were also included.

Sources 
The information in the syndicated episode list was obtained from the following sources:

 Episode numbers were obtained on a daily basis from GetTV's show page for Rescue 911 (by clicking the Program Schedule dropdown box) and from Pluto TV's on-demand watchlist for Rescue 911. Episode numbers in italics are unconfirmed by these sources and are assumed based on the episodes airing in sequence with episodes with known numbers.
 Episode titles were obtained from Fancast and TV Guide, except where cited. Titles denoted with an asterisk (*) were obtained Pluto TV's on-demand watchlist for Rescue 911 and may be incomplete, as Pluto TV truncated many of the titles in its listings.
 Justice Network air dates were obtained from TV Guide.
 Original air dates from first-run syndication were obtained from the TV listings sections in the following newspapers through newspapers.com:
The Bangor Daily News: "TV Watch" section in Saturday editions (Episodes 126S, 128S-130S, 191S-194S, 196S-200S, 276S-278S, 284S-285S, 296S-305S)
 The Daily American: "Weekender TV Section" in Saturday editions (Episodes 215S-220S, 236S-240S, 271S-275S, 279S-283S, 286S-295S)
 The Index-Journal – Greenwood, SC: "TV Index" section in Sunday editions (Episodes 106S-115S, 181S-185S)
 The Lincoln Journal Star: "TV Week" section in Saturday editions (Episodes 364S-365S, 371S-379S)
 Miami Herald: "Television" section in daily editions (Episodes 306S, 310S)
 The Manhattan Mercury: "TV Preview" section in Friday edition (Episodes 386S-390S)
 Press-Tribune: "TV Week" section in Sunday edition (Episodes 361S-363S)
 The Record: "Television & Cable" section in Sunday editions, "Television" section in daily editions (Episodes 101S-105S, 127S, 136S-150S)
 The San Bernardino County Sun: "Today's Highlights" section in daily editions (Episodes 186S-190S, 195S)
 The Sentinel: "Local Listings" section in Saturday editions (Episodes 116S-125S, 131S-135S, 151S-155S, 161S-180S, 201S-205S, 211S-214S, 221S-235S, 241S-270S, 311S-360S, 366S-370S)
 Statesman Journal: "Entertainment" section in daily editions (Episodes 206S-210S)
 The Times: "TV Times" section in Sunday editions (Episodes 307S-309S, 380S-383S, 391S-400S)
 Wausau Daily Herald: "TV Week" section in Sunday edition (Episodes 156S-160S)

Unaired Stories 
Several segments were filmed for Rescue 911 that never aired on the show. The following segments were reported in various local newspapers.

 A boy and his great-grandfather lost in the wilderness: In August 1989, ahead of the first-season premiere, Rescue 911 film crews traveled to Centralia, Washington to film a segment about a ten-year-old boy and his great grandfather who were lost for five days in the hills of the Coast Range near Pe Ell, Washington. The would-be segment was to run nine minutes and was tentatively planned to air in the fall but never materialized. A similar segment about two girls lost near Colorado's Devil's Head Lookout aired that November, and another about a young boy lost in New Mexico's Pecos Wilderness aired the following spring.
 A snorkeling accident leaves a man with air embolisms: In August 1992, Rescue 911 crews filmed a segment about an incident that occurred earlier that year in Florida's Vortex Spring. A snorkeler swam 30 feet down to investigate an overturned cattle trough with an air pocket inside (called the "talk box") that scuba divers use to talk to one another underwater. The man inhaled the pressurized air inside the talk box and resurfaced too quickly without exhaling, which caused the air in his lungs to expand rapidly and rupture multiple airways, releasing deadly air bubbles into his bloodstream. He was treated in a hyperbaric chamber and subsequently made a full recovery, despite the expectations of hospital staff. The segment was expected to air in fall of 1992, during the show's fourth season.
 A deaf couple uses a TDD to call for help: In August 1993, a segment was filmed in Midland, Texas about a deaf man who used a TDD to communicate with a 911 operator when his wife, who was also deaf, suffered heart failure. She was rushed to the hospital where she underwent a life-saving quadruple bypass operation. The couple opted to play themselves in the re-enactment. The segment was filmed by Katy Productions, a Los Angeles-based production company. It would have likely aired in the fifth season.
 A newly installed smoke detector saves a family: In May 1995, Rescue 911 crews filmed a segment in Windsor, Ontario about a mother and her two-year-old son who escaped a fire thanks to a newly installed smoke detector. Earlier on the day of the incident, she had called the local fire department when he got his head stuck in a rocking chair. While responding to the call, the firefighters noticed they had no smoke detector in their apartment and installed one for them. Just hours later, a fire broke out in the kitchen while they slept. The smoke alarm awakened the mother and allowed her to safely escape with her son. The segment was expected to air sometime in the seventh season.

External links
Rescue 911 episode guide
Rescue 911 Actress

References

Rescue 911